is a railway station operated by JR West in Tsuwano, Shimane, and is served by the Yamaguchi Line. Limited Express Super Oki stops here. And it is the terminal of sightseeing train SL Yamaguchi (steam train).

History

 August 5, 1918: Station opens
 April 1, 1987: Station operation is taken over by JR West after privatization of Japanese National Railways

Adjacent stations
West Japan Railway (JR West)
 █ Yamaguchi Line
 □Limited Express "Super Oki"
 Tokusa - Tsuwano - Nichihara
 ■Local
 Funahirayama - Tsuwano - Aonoyama

External links
 Tsuwano Station (JR West)

Railway stations in Japan opened in 1918
Railway stations in Shimane Prefecture
Stations of West Japan Railway Company